Maurício Camargo Lima (born January 27, 1968 in Campinas) is a retired volleyball player from Brazil. He participated in both Olympic gold medals of the Brazil men's national volleyball team (the only other player in both was Giovane Gávio), against The Netherlands at the 1992 Summer Olympics in Barcelona, Spain and against Italy at the 2004 Summer Olympics in Athens, Greece

He also won 5 Volleyball World Leagues (1993, 2001, 2003 and 2004), the 2002 FIVB Men's World Championship and the 2003 FIVB Men's World Cup.

Awards

Individuals
 1993 FIVB World League "Best Setter"
 2002 FIVB World Championship "Best Setter"

External links
 
 FIVB
 

1968 births
Living people
Brazilian men's volleyball players
Olympic volleyball players of Brazil
Olympic gold medalists for Brazil
Volleyball players at the 1988 Summer Olympics
Volleyball players at the 1992 Summer Olympics
Volleyball players at the 1996 Summer Olympics
Volleyball players at the 2000 Summer Olympics
Volleyball players at the 2004 Summer Olympics
Sportspeople from Campinas
Olympic medalists in volleyball
Volleyball players at the 2003 Pan American Games
Pan American Games bronze medalists for Brazil
Medalists at the 2004 Summer Olympics
Medalists at the 1992 Summer Olympics
Pan American Games medalists in volleyball
Medalists at the 2003 Pan American Games